Jonathan Daniel Wright (born December 14, 1977) is a former professional baseball pitcher. He played all or part of four seasons in Major League Baseball for the Chicago White Sox.

Wright grew up in Batesville, Arkansas and graduated from high school from Sullivan South in Kingsport, Tennessee. He pitched for the University of Arkansas from 1997-99. In 1998, he played collegiate summer baseball in the Cape Cod Baseball League for the Yarmouth-Dennis Red Sox.

Wright was drafted in the 2nd round (64th overall) by the Chicago White Sox. He pitched a 5-hit shutout against the Texas Rangers on May 16, 2002.

References

External links

Minor League Splits and Situational Stats

1977 births
Living people
Arkansas Razorbacks baseball players
Baseball players from Arkansas
Baseball players from Texas
Birmingham Barons players
Bristol White Sox players
Burlington Bees players
Charlotte Knights players
Chicago White Sox players
Major League Baseball pitchers
People from Batesville, Arkansas
People from Longview, Texas
Philadelphia Phillies scouts
Seattle Mariners scouts
Tacoma Rainiers players
Winston-Salem Warthogs players
Yarmouth–Dennis Red Sox players
Anchorage Glacier Pilots players